The Philip Jones Brass Ensemble, founded in 1951 by trumpeter Philip Jones, was one of the first modern classical brass ensembles to be formed.  The group played either as a quintet or as a ten-piece, for larger halls.  It toured and recorded extensively, and numerous arrangements were commissioned, many of which were bequeathed on Jones' death to the library of the Royal Northern College of Music.

The ensemble recorded Leonard Salzedo's signature fanfare for the Open University's television transmissions.

Following Philip Jones' retirement in 1986, a number of the members of the group continued to collaborate, yet changed their name to London Brass.

Members

Conductors 
 Elgar Howarth
 John Iveson

Trumpet

French horn

Trombone

Tuba

Percussion

Discography

Sources 
 McDonald, Donna: The Odyssey of the Philip Jones Brass Ensemble

External links 
 RNCM archive

Musical groups established in 1951
1951 establishments in the United Kingdom